La monaca di Monza is a 1962 Italian film directed by Carmine Gallone. It stars Gabriele Ferzetti, Giovanna Ralli and Mario Feliciani. The film is about a young nobleman who seduces a nun, leading to the death of the man and the internment of the woman.
The film is a drama but is laced with satire.

Cast
Giovanna Ralli as Virginia de Leyva
Gabriele Ferzetti as Gian Paolo Osio
Mario Feliciani as Don Martino de Leyva
Lilla Brignone as Donna Marianna
Gino Cervi as Cardinale Borromeo
Emma Gramatica as Badessa Anziana
Evi Maltagliati as Badessa Inbeserco
Elisa Cegani as La Monaca Portinaia
Corrado Pani as Molteno
Giulia Rubini as Benedetta
Rosy Mazzacurati as Ottavia
Fosco Giachetti as Monsignor Barca
Hélène Chanel as Caterina
Alberto Lupo as Giudice

References

External links

1962 films
Italian drama films
1960s Italian-language films
Films directed by Carmine Gallone
Films scored by Ennio Morricone
Films about clerical celibacy
Films scored by Giovanni Fusco
Cultural depictions of Italian women
1960s Italian films